Kanna  is a village in the administrative district of Gmina Bolesław, within Dąbrowa County, Lesser Poland Voivodeship, in southern Poland.

Location 

The village lies about 80 km east of Kraków, 40 km north of Tarnów
and 3 km from the municipality community Bolesław on the northern edge of Powiśle Dabrowski
and hence on the north-eastern end of the Malopolska province, in the bend of the Wisła River in front of the mouth of Nida.

Environment

Animal World 

The animal resources in the district Dąbrowa can be considered rich. They live here, among others November, badger, marten, European pine marten, weasel, boar, moose, deer and in recent years there was also a Beaver. Can also be found in meadows Hamster European which is legally protected and lives only in nature.
The birds include the Accipitrinae, common raven, goldfinch, lesser spotted eagle, common kestrel necked, tern, northern lapwing, cormorant, corncrake and woodpecker, Eurasian eagle-owl or buzzard

Climate 

Climate areas belonging to the Sandomierz Basin is one of the warmest in Poland. average temperature
July is above 19 °C, average January -30 °C. Growing season reaches 220 days, annual rainfall 600 – 700 mm. These are favorable factors for the development of agriculture and tourism.

Landmarks 

On a small square surrounded by local roads, stands a brick chapel of Our Lady of the Rosary. Built in 1871 on the set r closed three-sided rectangle
the baroque shape signature tower rising high above the roofs steepness retained its original harmony and elegance. The chapel was restored in 2007.

Sports and Recreation 

Located on the Plains Tarnobrzeg has, as a whole Powiśle very favorable climatic conditions, due to the high average temperature of the year. Peripheral location on the sidelines of city funds and major transportation routes makes the village is ideal for those who like peace and nature.

In the village there is a playground, as well as working Volunteer Fire Department, located in the House of the People, which every year organizes sports competitions - fire.

Culture 

People's work in the house Song and Dance Ensemble.

Group action is the care, development and promotion of culture, diversifying cultural events, as well as to the traditions and culture are preserved for subsequent years and were saved from oblivion for the next generations.

Communication 

Provide public transport microbus private lines and a few bus exchange.

Coming from Cracow to the village can be reached by national  crossing the Wisła River the ferry Nowy Korczyn/Borusowa, then provincial road  heading towards the city and then Żabno Szczucin. Coming from the direction of the Tarnow Dabrowa Tarnowska or Żabno.

Statistics 
 Total area of 462 hectares, of which 398 ha of land (68.4% arable land, orchards 0.2%, 1.4% grassland)
 Number of households 75 of which 13% is maintained exclusively from farms, 80% of farms + non-agricultural wages, and the remaining 7% are mainly non-agricultural wages and other sources of income.

See also 
 Cana
 Kafr Kanna
 Kanna Arihara

Villages in Dąbrowa County